Hans-Günter Neues (14 November 1950 – 16 November 2016) was a German football player and coach. As a player, he spent nine seasons in the Bundesliga with SC Fortuna Köln, Rot-Weiss Essen and 1. FC Kaiserslautern. In 1983, he played with the Toronto Nationals of the Canadian Professional Soccer League. He died of cancer in 2016.

Honours
 DFB-Pokal finalist: 1980–81

References

External links
 

1950 births
2016 deaths
German footballers
Association football defenders
Bundesliga players
2. Bundesliga players
Canadian Professional Soccer League (original) players
SC Fortuna Köln players
Rot-Weiss Essen players
1. FC Kaiserslautern players
Toronto Nationals (soccer) players
German football managers